Gavrilo III Nikolić was Archbishop of Peć and Serbian Patriarch from 1752 to 1758.

Before he became Serbian Patriarch, he was Metropolitan of Niš, under Serbian patriarch Atanasije II. When Atanasije died in 1752, Serbian patriarchal throne was taken by Metropolitan of Dabar-Bosnia Gavrilo Mihailović who also died soon after returning from Constantinople in the autumn of the same year, struck by sudden illness. Before death, he made succession arrangements with metropolitan Gavrilo Nikolić, who was elected new Serbian Patriarch as Gavrilo III. In following years, Serbian Patriarchate of Peć was in constant internal turmoil, accompanied by worsening financial crisis and huge debts. Between 1755 and 1758, Gavrilo III was challenged by rivals and finally lost the patriarchal throne, but in 1761, a group of Serbian bishops and other ecclesiastical leaders who met in Niš tried to bring him back, without final success.

References

Sources

Further reading
 Љ. Дурковић- Јакшић: „Покушај Црквене конференције у Нишу 1761. да поврати патријарха Гаврила III на пећки престо,“ у: Зборник Православног богословског факултета II, Београд 1951, 135- 139.

External links
 Official site of the Serbian Orthodox Church: Serbian Archbishops and Patriarchs 

Gavrilo III
18th-century Serbian people
Serbs from the Ottoman Empire